Pistyll y Llyn is one of the tallest waterfalls in Wales and the United Kingdom.

It is formed where the River Llyfnant falls from Llyn Penrhaeadr for approximately  into Cwm Rhaeadr in two waterfalls, and a series of cascades.

References

Waterfalls of Ceredigion
Waterfalls of Powys